Col. John Hannum House is a historic house located in East Bradford Township, Chester County, Pennsylvania. The original section was built about 1760, and has three additions.  The original section is  stories and constructed of fieldstone. It is five bays wide and has a gable roof. It has a two-story rectangular wing with a gable roof.  Attached to the wing is a banked addition and one-story garage.  It was the home of politician, businessman and colonial militiaman John Hannum III (1744 – 1799).

It was added to the National Register of Historic Places in 1980.

References

Houses on the National Register of Historic Places in Pennsylvania
Georgian architecture in Pennsylvania
Houses completed in 1760
Houses in Chester County, Pennsylvania
National Register of Historic Places in Chester County, Pennsylvania